Gretna waga, also known as the common crepuscular skipper, is a species of butterfly in the family Hesperiidae. It is found in Senegal, the Gambia, Guinea, Sierra Leone, Liberia, Ivory Coast, Ghana, Togo, Nigeria, Cameroon, Gabon, the Republic of the Congo, the Democratic Republic of the Congo and Uganda. The habitat consists of forests and open areas in the forest zone.

Adults have been recorded feeding on the nectar of asclepiad flowers.

The larvae feed on Elaeis guineense.

References

Butterflies described in 1886
Erionotini
Butterflies of Africa